In mathematics, particularly in functional analysis, a seminorm is a vector space norm that need not be positive definite.  Seminorms are intimately connected with convex sets: every seminorm is the Minkowski functional of some absorbing disk and, conversely, the Minkowski functional of any such set is a seminorm.

A topological vector space is locally convex if and only if its topology is induced by a family of seminorms.

Definition

Let  be a vector space over either the real numbers  or the complex numbers  
A real-valued function  is called a  if it satisfies the following two conditions:

 Subadditivity/Triangle inequality:  for all 
 Absolute homogeneity:  for all  and all scalars 

These two conditions imply that  and that every seminorm  also has the following property:
Nonnegativity:  for all 

Some authors include non-negativity as part of the definition of "seminorm" (and also sometimes of "norm"), although this is not necessary since it follows from the other two properties. 

Positive definite/: for all  if  then 

Since absolute homogeneity implies positive homogeneity, every seminorm is a type of function called a sublinear function. A map  is called a  if it is subadditive and positive homogeneous. Unlike a seminorm, a sublinear function is  necessarily nonnegative. Sublinear functions are often encountered in the context of the Hahn–Banach theorem. 
A real-valued function  is a seminorm if and only if it is a sublinear and balanced function.

Examples

Let  be a measure on a space . For an arbitrary constant , let  be the set of all functions  for which

exists and is finite.
Every real-valued sublinear function  on a real vector space  induces a seminorm  defined by 
Any finite sum of seminorms is a seminorm. The restriction of a seminorm (respectively, norm) to a vector subspace is once again a seminorm (respectively, norm).
 and 
where  and 
 while 

Minkowski functionals and seminorms

Seminorms on a vector space  are intimately tied, via Minkowski functionals, to subsets of  that are convex, balanced, and absorbing.

Algebraic properties

Every seminorm is a sublinear function, and thus satisfies all properties of a sublinear function, including convexity,  and for all vectors :
the reverse triangle inequality: 

and also
 and 

For any vector  and positive real 

and furthermore,  is an absorbing disk in 

Other properties of seminorms

Every seminorm is a balanced function. 
A seminorm  is a norm on  if and only if  does not contain a non-trivial vector subspace. 

Furthermore, for any real  

If  is a normed space and  then  for all  in the interval  

Every norm is a convex function and consequently, finding a global maximum of a norm-based objective function is sometimes tractable.

Relationship to other norm-like concepts

Let  be a non-negative function. The following are equivalent:
 is a seminorm.
 is a convex -seminorm.
 is a convex balanced G-seminorm.

If any of the above conditions hold, then the following are equivalent:
 is a norm;
 does not contain a non-trivial vector subspace.

If  is a sublinear function on a real vector space  then the following are equivalent: 
 is a linear functional;
;
;

Inequalities involving seminorms

If  are seminorms on  then:
 if and only if  implies 

 on  if and only if 

Hahn–Banach theorem for seminorms

Seminorms offer a particularly clean formulation of the Hahn–Banach theorem: 
If  is a vector subspace of a seminormed space  and if  is a continuous linear functional on  then  may be extended to a continuous linear functional  on  that has the same norm as 

A similar extension property also holds for seminorms:

Topologies of seminormed spaces

Pseudometrics and the induced topology

This topology is Hausdorff if and only if  is a metric, which occurs if and only if  is a norm. 
This topology makes  into a locally convex pseudometrizable topological vector space that has a bounded neighborhood of the origin and a neighborhood basis at the origin consisting of the following open balls (or the closed balls) centered at the origin:

as  ranges over the positive reals. 
Every seminormed space  should be assumed to be endowed with this topology unless indicated otherwise. A topological vector space whose topology is induced by some seminorm is called . 

Any seminorm-induced topology makes  locally convex, as follows.

Stronger, weaker, and equivalent seminorms

The notions of stronger and weaker seminorms are akin to the notions of stronger and weaker norms.

 If  is a sequence in  then  in  implies  in 
 If  is a net in  then  in  implies  in 
  is bounded on 
 If  then  for all 
 There exists a real  such that  on 

This happens if they satisfy any of the following conditions:
If  is a sequence in  then  if and only if 
There exist positive real numbers  and  such that

Normability and seminormability

A TVS is normable if and only if it is seminormable and Hausdorff or equivalently, if and only if it is seminormable and T1 (because a TVS is Hausdorff if and only if it is a T1 space). 
A  is a topological vector space that possesses a bounded neighborhood of the origin. 

Normability of topological vector spaces is characterized by Kolmogorov's normability criterion. 
A TVS is seminormable if and only if it has a convex bounded neighborhood of the origin. 
Thus a locally convex TVS is seminormable if and only if it has a non-empty bounded open set.
A TVS is normable if and only if it is a T1 space and admits a bounded convex neighborhood of the origin.

If  is a Hausdorff locally convex TVS then the following are equivalent: 
 is normable.
 is seminormable.
 has a bounded neighborhood of the origin.
Furthermore,  is finite dimensional if and only if  is normable (here  denotes  endowed with the weak-* topology).

The product of infinitely many seminormable space is again seminormable if and only if all but finitely many of these spaces trivial (that is, 0-dimensional).

Topological properties

A subset  in a seminormed space  is bounded if and only if  is bounded.
The product of infinitely many seminormable spaces is again seminormable if and only if all but finitely many of these spaces are trivial (that is, 0-dimensional).

Continuity of seminorms

If  is a seminorm on a topological vector space  then the following are equivalent: 
 is continuous.
 is continuous at 0;
There exists a continuous seminorm  on  such that 

Continuity of linear maps

If  is a map between seminormed spaces then let

If  is a linear map between seminormed spaces then the following are equivalent:
 is continuous;
;
There exists a real  such that ;
 In this case, 
If  is continuous then  for all 

The space of all continuous linear maps  between seminormed spaces is itself a seminormed space under the seminorm  
This seminorm is a norm if  is a norm.

Generalizations

A composition algebra  consists of an algebra over a field  an involution  and a quadratic form  which is called the "norm".  In several cases  is an isotropic quadratic form so that  has at least one null vector, contrary to the separation of points required for the usual norm discussed in this article.

Weakening subadditivity: Quasi-seminorms

A map  is called a  if it is (absolutely) homogeneous and there exists some  such that 

Weakening homogeneity - -seminorms

We have the following relationship between quasi-seminorms and -seminorms:

See also

Notes

Proofs

References

External links

 Sublinear functions
 The sandwich theorem for sublinear and super linear functionals

 
Linear algebra